Kebakalan is a village in the town of Mandiraja, Banjarnegara Regency, Central Java Province, Indonesia.  this village has an area of 86.39 hectares and a population of 1,391 inhabitants in 2010.

References

External links
 Banjarnegara Regency Official Website
 BPS Kabupaten Banjarnegara

Banjarnegara Regency
Villages in Central Java